Quiet Signs is the third studio album by American singer-songwriter Jessica Pratt. It was released on February 8, 2019, through Mexican Summer. The album was produced by Al Carlson.

Track listing

Charts

References

2019 albums
Jessica Pratt (musician) albums